Gerbrand Adriaenszoon Bredero (16 March 1585 – 23 August 1618) was a Dutch poet and playwright in the period known as the Dutch Golden Age.

Life

Gerbrand Adriaenszoon Bredero was born on 16 March 1585 in Amsterdam in the Dutch Republic, where he lived his whole life. He called himself "G.A. Bredero, Amstelredammer", and sometimes he is called Breero or Brederode. He was the third child of Marry Gerbrants and Adriaen Cornelisz Bredero, who was a shoemaker and a successful real estate agent. Bredero was born in the Nes, nowadays number 41, and in 1602 he and his family moved to a house on Oudezijds Voorburgwal, now number 244, which his father had bought. Bredero lived in this house for the rest of his life. Both houses are now restaurants in Amsterdam's famous red light district.

At school Bredero learned French and possibly also some English and Latin. Later he was educated as an artist by the Antwerp painter Francesco Badens, but none of his paintings have survived. In 1611 he became a member of the rederijkerskamer d'Eglantier, where he was an active member and became friends with Roemer Visscher and P.C.Hooft. Together with Hooft he joined Costers Nederduytsche Academie. Around this time he wrote the play "De Spaanschen Brabander Jerolimo".

The only public position Bredero achieved  was as vaandrig or standard bearer of the civic guard. On 23 August 1618, at the age of 33, Bredero suddenly died, shortly after he had recovered from pneumonia that he had contracted after falling through ice. He never married.

Plays
 Rodd'rick ende Alphonsus (first performed in 1611)
 Griane (first performed in 1612)
 Klucht van de Koe
 Klucht van de Molenaer
 Moortje (first performed in 1615)
 Lucelle (first performed circa 1616)
 Spaansen Brabander (Spanish Brabanter; first performed in 1617)

References

External links

 G.A. Bredero – digital versions of a major part his oeuvre (in Dutch)
 Bredero song text page – English translations of several songs of Bredero
 G.A. Bredero 1585–1618 – pictures of Bredero
 Newly discovered poems of Bredero and Starter – digital versions of in 2004 discovered poems (in Dutch)

1585 births
1618 deaths
17th-century Dutch poets
17th-century Dutch dramatists and playwrights
Dutch Golden Age writers
Dutch male poets
Muiderkring
Writers from Amsterdam
Dutch male dramatists and playwrights